The Rolling Knolls Landfill is a landfill located in the Green Village section of Chatham Township in New Jersey. It is bordered on two sides by the Great Swamp National Wildlife Refuge, and was formerly known as Miele's Dump, after owner Robert Miele.

The Landfill is notable for being identified by the Environmental Protection Agency as a Superfund site. It was operated as a municipal landfill from the early 1930s until December 1968, during which time it handled municipal solid waste, as well as construction and demolition debris from neighboring communities.

"According to the EPA's Web site, soil samples collected in 1999 showed levels of metals, phthalates, and polychlorinated biphenyls (PCBs) that were above regulation norms.

Mercury and PCB releases were also observed in a surface water and sediment sample taken from a portion of the landfill located within the Great Swamp Wildlife Refuge, according to the EPA. Testing also showed "actual contamination of a terrestrial sensitive environment," and indicated potential exposure of nearby residents, the EPA says.

See also
Landfill in the United States

References

 

RPublic Health Assessment for Rolling Knolls Landfill July 5, 2006lling Knolls Landfill

Landfills in the United States
Geography of Morris County, New Jersey
Superfund sites in New Jersey